Wikstroemia liangii is a shrub, of the family Thymelaeaceae.  It is native to China, specifically Hainan.

Description
The shrub grows up to 2.0 m tall. Its branches are reddish-brown and glabrous and it flowers between June and September. It is often found in forest and stream banks.

References

liangii
Taxa named by Elmer Drew Merrill